Bert Tremlin (18 September 1877 – 12 April 1936) was an English cricketer. He played for Essex between 1900 and 1919.

References

External links

1877 births
1936 deaths
English cricketers
Essex cricketers
People from Westerleigh
Marylebone Cricket Club cricketers
East of England cricketers
Sportspeople from Gloucestershire